Ophthalmology is a monthly peer-reviewed medical journal published by Elsevier on behalf of the American Academy of Ophthalmology. It covers all aspects of ophthalmology.

Editors
The following persons are or have been editor-in-chief:
Stephen McLeod (2017–present)
George B. Bartley (2012–2017)
Andrew P. Schachat (2003–2012)

Family of Journals
On June 6, 2016 The American Academy of Ophthalmology announced plans to launch Ophthalmology Retina as an extension of the journal Ophthalmology. This new journal was planned in response to the growing volume of  research within the retina subspecialty of ophthalmology, and will be a print and online publication.

References

External links

Ophthalmology journals
Elsevier academic journals
Monthly journals
English-language journals
Publications established in 1978